Troilus of Constantinople was a sophist from Side in Pamphylia of the late 4th and early 5th century. He taught in Constantinople.
He wrote 7 books.

Bibliography

 Arnold Hugh Martin Jones, The Prosopography of the Later Roman Empire, 2 (AD 395–527), 1980, p. 1128

References

Sophists
4th-century births
5th-century deaths
5th-century philosophers
Ancient Roman philosophers